Mary E. Pearson (born August 14, 1955) is an American children's writer best known for young adult fiction.

Her book A Room on Lorelei Street won the 2006 Golden Kite Award for fiction. Her book The Adoration of Jenna Fox was a finalist for the Andre Norton Award and is being adapted into a movie.

Selected works 
 David v. God (Houghton Mifflin Harcourt, 2000)
 Scribbler of Dreams (Harcourt Paperbacks, 2002)
 A Room on Lorelei Street (Henry Holt and Co., 2005)
 The Miles Between (Holt, 2009)

The Jenna Fox Chronicles 

The Adoration of Jenna Fox (Holt, 2008)
The Fox Inheritance (Holt, 2011)
Fox Forever (Holt, 2013)

The Remnant Chronicles

The Kiss of Deception  (Holt, 2014)
The Heart of Betrayal  (Holt, 2015)
The Beauty of Darkness (Holt, 2016)
Morrighan (Holt, 2016)

Dance of Thieves 
Set in the same world as The Remnant Chronicles

 Dance of Thieves (Holt, 2018)
Vow of Thieves (Holt, 2019)

Picture Books 

Pickles in My Soup, illustrated by Tom Payne (New York: Children's Press, 1999)
Where Is Max?, illustrated by Samantha L. Walker (Children's, 2000)
Generous Me, illustrated by Gary Krejca (Children's Press, 2005)
Fast Dan, illustrated by Eldon C. Doty (Children's Press, 2005)
I Can Do It All, illustrated by Jeff Shelly (Children's Press, 2008)

References

External links

 
 

1955 births
American children's writers
Writers from California
Living people
San Diego State University alumni
Place of birth missing (living people)
American writers of young adult literature
American women novelists